Lutterbeck is a small community about 4 km north of Moringen in Lower Saxony, Germany.  Its history goes back to at least AD 1100, though it was totally laid waste in the late 15th century. In 1974, it was incorporated into the Moringen district. Today there are 175 residents.

References 

Municipalities in Lower Saxony